Joram (Hebrew: יורם‎) is a Jewish and African masculine given name. It may refer to the following notable people:
Joram Gumbo, Zimbabwean politician
Joram van Klaveren (born 1979), Dutch politician
Joram Lindenstrauss (1936–2012), Israeli mathematician
Joram Lürsen (born 1963), Dutch film and television director
Joram Mariga (1927–2000), Zimbabwean sculptor
Joram Mugume, Ugandan military officer
Joram Piatigorsky (born 1940), American author, molecular biologist and eye researcher
Joram Rozov (born 1938), Israeli artist
Joram Shnider (born 1941), Israeli swimmer